Sabina Murray, Lady Hill (born 1968) is Filipina-American screenwriter and a novelist. She currently is a professor in the MFA Program for Poets & Writers at the University of Massachusetts Amherst.

Background and career
The daughter of an American father and a Filipina mother, Murray grew up in Australia, Pennsylvania, and the Philippines. She received her B.A. in art history from Mount Holyoke College in 1989 and her M.A. in English and creative writing from The University of Texas in 1994. She also completed post-graduate study in fiction from The University of Texas in 1994. She has previously been a Roger Muray Writer-in-Residence at Phillips Academy (Andover, Massachusetts) and was published in Ploughshares, Ontario Review, and the New England Review.  She was also the fiction judge for the Drunken Boat's First Annual Panliterary Awards.

Murray currently lives in western Massachusetts, where she is on the fiction faculty at University of Massachusetts Amherst (along with Jeff Parker, Edie Meidav and Noy Holland). She is on the editorial board of the literary magazine The Common, based at Amherst College.

Awards and fellowships
Several major awards, including the PEN/Faulkner Award for Fiction (2003).
A Carnivore's Inquiry, was named a "Best Book of the Year" by The Chicago Tribune.
Fellowship from the Michener Center at The University of Texas, Austin
Bunting fellowship from the Radcliffe Institute for Advanced Study.
Nominated for the Best First Screenplay Award (Independent Spirit Awards 2005)
Guggenheim Fellowship 2007

Screenplays
The Beautiful Country (2004) (Terrence Malick, Nick Nolte, Bai Ling)

Books
Slow Burn (Ballantine Books, 1990)
The Caprices (Mariner Books, 2002)
A Carnivore's Inquiry (Grove/Atlantic, 2004)
Forgery (Grove/Atlantic, 2007)
Tales Of the New World (Grove/Atlantic, 2011)
Valiant Gentlemen (Grove Atlantic, 2016) (a historical novel based on Irish revolutionary Roger Casement's friendship with Herbert Ward and his wife Sarita Sanfor)

External links

 Book Page Review
 The Caprices at Fiction Award Winners Dot Com
 Tales Of the New World Review in The New York Times
 Caprices Review in The New York Times
 Review in Ploughshares
 Review at Small Spiral Notebook
 The MFA Program for Poets & Writers at The University of Massachusetts
 Nick Nolte Interview About "The Beautiful Country" in Stumped Magazine

References

1968 births
Living people
20th-century American novelists
21st-century American novelists
American women novelists
Novelists from Massachusetts
Mount Holyoke College alumni
American women screenwriters
University of Massachusetts Amherst faculty
American writers of Filipino descent
American novelists of Asian descent
20th-century American women writers
21st-century American women writers
PEN/Faulkner Award for Fiction winners
Screenwriters from Massachusetts
Filipino American
American women academics
Wives of knights